Stedelijk Gymnasium Leiden is a gymnasium  in the Netherlands. Located in Leiden, it is one of the oldest schools in the Netherlands. Its history dates back to the Middle Ages. The Stedelijk Gymnasium Leiden is the biggest gymnasium-only school in the Netherlands, with over 1,800 pupils (in 2014).

History 
The school is named in a charter of count William III of Holland in 1323 under the name schole or scoele, and is probably founded in the second half of the 13th century. After the Siege of Leiden (1573–1574) Nicholaus Stochius was named rector. Around 1700 the school was named gymnasium in official Latin documents (in Dutch: Latijnse school). The name Stedelijk ('municipal') Gymnasium was introduced in 1838, together with a new educational approach.

Buildings 
 1324 (?)-1883: Lokhorststraat in the centre of Leiden (architect Lieven de Key)
 1883–1938: Doezastraat
 1938–present: Fruinlaan (named after professor Robert Fruin, who taught at the school)
 2001–2010: extra building at Noordeinde
 2010–present: second building Gooimeerlaan (“location Socrates”)

LEMUN and international contacts 

Since 2001 Stedelijk Gymnasium organizes the Leiden Model United Nations (LEMUN), which is part of the international Model United Nations (MUN)-conferences.
The Stedelijk Gymnasium has contacts with schools from Sweden, Poland, Hungary, Germany, Italy and Belgium to exchange students.

Alumni 
Iefke van Belkum, waterpolo player
 Biurakn Hakhverdian, waterpolo player
 Stef Blok, politician VVD
 Herman Boerhaave, botanist
 Eduard Bomhoff, economist, politician LPF
 Armin van Buuren, disc jockey 
 Rudolf van Eecke, entomologist
 Tatjana Ehrenfest, mathematician 
 Rudolf Escher, composer 
 Erik Falkenburg, football player Willem II
 Gerrit Jan van Heuven Goedhart, High Commissioner for Refugees
 Jan Willem de Jong, indologist
 Janneke Jonkman, writer
 Matthijs Huizing, politician VVD
 Patrick de Josselin de Jong, professor cultural anthropology
 Benk Korthals, politician VVD, former Minister of Justice
 Aad Kosto, politician Partij van de Arbeid 
 Gerard Laman, mathematician
 Marjolijn Molenaar, international cricketer
 Frits van Oostrom, professor medieval literature, former president KNAW
 Laurine van Riessen, speed skater
 Rembrandt van Rijn, painter
 Max van der Stoel, politician Partij van de Arbeid, former Minister of Foreign Affairs, former High Commissioner OCSE
 Albertus Willem Sijthoff, publisher   
Teachers
 Ria Beckers
 Petrus Johannes Blok
 Pieter Helbert Damsté
 Robert Fruin, teacher geography and history
 Abraham Kuenen
 Jean Abraham Chrétien Oudemans
 Gilles Quispel
 Cornelis Schrevel

See also
 Education in the Netherlands
 List of the oldest schools in the world

External links 
 Website Stedelijk Gymnasium, Leiden

Publication 

 A. M. Coebergh van den Braak: Meer dan zes eeuwen Leids Gymnasium. Leiden, 1988. 2e rev.ed., 1997:

References 

Schools in South Holland
Gymnasiums in the Netherlands
Educational institutions established in the 13th century
13th-century establishments in Europe